The 2022 Adelaide 500 (known for commercial reasons as the 2022 VALO Adelaide 500) was a motor racing event for the Supercars Championship held from Thursday 1 December through to Sunday 4 December 2022. The event was held at the Adelaide Street Circuit in Adelaide, South Australia, and was the twenty-third running of the Adelaide 500. It was the last event of thirteen in the 2022 Supercars Championship and consisted of two races of 250 kilometres.

The races were be supported by Touring Car Masters, GT World Challenge, S5000 Tasman Series, Aussie Racing Cars and Dunlop Super2 & Super3 Series.

Results

Practice

Race 1

Qualifying

Race

Race 2

Qualifying

Race

Championship standings after the race

Drivers' Championship standings

Teams' Championship standings

 Note: Only the top five positions are included for both sets of standings.

References

External links

Supercars Championship races
Motorsport in Adelaide
Adelaide 500